Powell Street station (often Powell station) is a combined BART and Muni Metro rapid transit station in the Market Street subway in downtown San Francisco. Located under Market Street between 4th Street and 5th Street, it serves the Financial District neighborhood and surrounding areas. The three-level station has a large fare mezzanine level, with separate platform levels for Muni Metro and BART below. The fare mezzanine also connects to the Union Square/Market Street station. The Powell-Mason and Powell-Hyde cable car lines turn around at Powell and Market adjacent to the station and Hallidie Plaza.

BART service at the station began on November 5, 1973, followed by Muni Metro service on February 18, 1980.

Station layout

Like the three other shared Muni/BART stations in the Market Street subway, Powell has three underground levels. The first level is a fare mezzanine, with two Muni paid areas and two BART paid areas. The second level has a single island platform for Muni Metro, and the third level has an island platform for BART. The station has eight street entrances along its length, plus two underground entrances to the fare mezzanine from the concourse level of the Westfield San Francisco Centre mall. A closed passageway leads from the northeast end of the station under Market Street partway to Third Street; this was planned to be a direct entrance from the Yerba Buena Center development, but was never completed.
 
The Central Subway passes under the Powell station complex at Stockton and Fourth streets, with Union Square/Market Street station located north of Powell station under Stockton Street. The stations are connected outside of Muni fare control by a passageway. The existing Stockton/Ellis entrance to Powell Street station was closed for a planned five years on April 24, 2013, so that it could be modified to include the connection to the new station. The closure was originally planned for the previous August, but delayed after Muni determined it was not yet needed. Muni purchased the entrance from BART for one dollar. Central Subway service began on November 19, 2022, with the Ellis entrance reopened.
 
Following the 2015 addition of a canopy over an escalator at 19th Street Oakland station, which reduced escalator downtime by one-third, BART decided to add canopies to all downtown Oakland and San Francisco entrances. The canopies will protect the escalator from weather damage, improve lighting, allow the escalator to be fully closed off when the station is not open, and provide a location for real-time train arrival information displays. The Powell station entrance at Market and Ellis was chosen for early implementation; it was closed on November 6, 2017, with the new canopy opened on September 29, 2018. Construction of the Market Street entrances will begin in 2020, with completion in 2027. The southern entrance of 5th Street was closed on January 10, 2022, for canopy construction.
 
In September 2015, BART released a report on possible modernization of the station. A total of $93 million in potential improvements were identified, including escalator replacement and canopy construction ($25 million), a corridor to Cyril Magnin ($13.7 million), a new mid-station elevator ($6.1 million), platform screen doors ($6 million), additional platform stairs ($5.6 million), and numerous other projects. Bathrooms in underground BART stations were closed due to security concerns after the 9/11 attacks. In 2019, BART indicated plans to open a new bathroom with an attendant at Powell in 2021. In November 2019, the board issued an $11 million contract for improvements at Powell, with the bathroom expected to cost an additional $20 million. The new bathrooms opened on February 2, 2022. The renovation was completed in November 2022. It included a ceiling artwork titled Elysium, which depicts an illuminated view of the buildings above the station.

Pigeons living in the station are a nuisance, which has prompted BART to take countermeasures such as installing nets and metal screens to block their nesting spots. The pigeons are attracted by passengers littering and by nearby street food vendors. 

After a test at Castro, colored lights were installed on escalators at Muni Metro stations in 2018–19. Those at Powell are yellow and burgundy, reflecting the colors of the cable cars. The entrances on the southern side of the station were closed on April 13, 2020, due to low ridership during the COVID-19 pandemic. The center entrance reopened on May 15, 2021, with the remaining entrances reopened on June 12. BART plans to add a faregate on the platform for the elevator in 2022.

Connections

Two Muni heritage streetcar stops are located above Powell Street station: Market and 4th Street (inbound) / Market and Stockton (outbound), and Market and 5th Street. Both are served by the F Market and Wharves line. The Powell and Market turntable of the San Francisco cable car system, terminus of the Powell/Hyde and Powell/Mason lines, is located adjacent to the station next to Haladie Plaza. The station is also served by a number of Muni bus and trolleybus routes:
Rapid: , 

AC Transit serves Powell Street station with the 800 All Nighter route during hours that BART is not operating.

Additional Muni, Golden Gate Transit (30, 70, 101, 101X), and SamTrans (FCX, 292, 397, 398) bus routes run on Mission Street, one block away.

Under the planned Better Market Street project, F stops would be consolidated to reduce travel times. The inbound stop at 5th Street and both stops at 4th Street would be discontinued, with a new inbound stop midway between 4th and 5th.

References

External links 

BART: Powell St. Station
SFMTA: Powell Station inbound, outbound
SF Bay Transit (unofficial): MUNI Metro Powell Station, Powell St. BART Station

Bay Area Rapid Transit stations in San Francisco
Stations on the Yellow Line (BART)
Stations on the Green Line (BART)
Stations on the Red Line (BART)
Stations on the Blue Line (BART)
Muni Metro stations
Market Street (San Francisco)
Union Square, San Francisco
Railway stations in the United States opened in 1973
1973 establishments in California
Railway stations located underground in California